Sufetula choreutalis is a moth in the family Crambidae. It was described by Snellen in 1879. It is found in Indonesia (Sulawesi).

References

Moths described in 1879
Spilomelinae